Peter Kenneth Frampton (born 22 April 1950) is a English-American guitarist, singer and songwriter who rose to prominence as a member of the rock bands the Herd and Humble Pie. Later in his career Frampton found success as a solo artist. He has released several albums, including his breakthrough album, the live release Frampton Comes Alive! (1976), which spawned several hit singles and has earned 8× Platinum by the RIAA in the United States. He has also worked with acts such as Ringo Starr, the Who's John Entwistle, David Bowie, and both Matt Cameron and Mike McCready of Pearl Jam.

Frampton is best known for such hits as "Show Me the Way", "Baby, I Love Your Way", "Do You Feel Like We Do", and "I'm in You", which remain staples of classic rock radio. He has also appeared as himself in television shows such as The Simpsons, Family Guy, and Madam Secretary.

Early life
Peter Kenneth Frampton was born to Owen Frampton and Peggy (née ) Frampton in Beckenham, Kent. He attended Bromley Technical High School, at which his father was a teacher and the head of the Art department. He first became interested in music when he was seven years old. Having discovered his grandmother's banjolele in the attic, he taught himself to play it, going on to later teach himself how to play guitar and piano as well.  At the age of eight, he began taking classical music lessons.

His early influences came from Cliff Richard & the Shadows, Buddy Holly, Eddie Cochran and later the Ventures, Jimi Hendrix and the Beatles. His father introduced him to the recordings of Belgian gypsy jazz guitarist Django Reinhardt.

Music career

Early bands
By the age of 12, Frampton played in a band called the Little Ravens. Both he and David Bowie, who was three years older, were pupils at Bromley Technical School where Frampton's father was Bowie's art teacher. The Little Ravens played on the same bill at school as Bowie's band, George and the Dragons. Peter and David would spend lunch breaks together, playing Buddy Holly songs.

At the age of 14, Peter was playing with a band called the Trubeats followed by a band called the Preachers, who later became Moon's Train, produced and managed by Bill Wyman of the Rolling Stones.

He became a successful child singer, and in 1966 he became a member of the Herd. He was the lead guitarist and singer, scoring several British pop hits. Frampton was named "The Face of 1968" by teen magazine Rave.

In 1969, when Frampton was 18 years old, he joined with Steve Marriott of Small Faces to form Humble Pie.

While playing with Humble Pie, Frampton also did session recording with other artists, including: Harry Nilsson, Jerry Lee Lewis,  and John Entwistle's Whistle Rymes, in 1972. Pete Drake introduced him to the "talk box" that was to become one of his trademark guitar effects.

Solo career
After four studio albums and one live album with Humble Pie, Frampton left the band and went solo in 1971, just in time to see Rockin' the Fillmore rise up the US charts. He remained with Dee Anthony (1926-2009), the same personal manager that Humble Pie had used.

His own debut was 1972's Wind of Change, with guest artists Ringo Starr and Billy Preston. This album was followed by Frampton's Camel in 1973, which featured Frampton working within a group project. In 1974, Frampton released Somethin's Happening. Frampton toured extensively to support his solo career, joined for three years by his former Herd mate Andy Bown on keyboards, Rick Wills on bass, and American drummer John Siomos. In 1975, the Frampton album was released. The album went to No. 32 in the US charts and is certified Gold by the RIAA.

Peter Frampton had little commercial success with his early albums. This changed with Frampton's best-selling live album, Frampton Comes Alive!, in 1976, from which "Baby, I Love Your Way", "Show Me the Way", and an edited version of "Do You Feel Like We Do", were hit singles. The latter two tracks also featured his use of the talk box guitar effect. The album was recorded in 1975, mainly at the Winterland Ballroom in San Francisco, California, where Humble Pie had previously enjoyed a good following. Frampton had a new line-up, with Americans Bob Mayo on keyboards and rhythm guitar and Stanley Sheldon on bass. Wills had been sacked by Frampton at the end of 1974, and Bown had left on the eve of Frampton Comes Alive, to return to England and new fame with Status Quo. Frampton Comes Alive was released in early January, debuting on the charts on 14 February at number 191. The album was on the Billboard 200 for 97 weeks, of which 55 were in the top 40, of which 10 were at the top. The album beat, among others, Fleetwood Mac's Fleetwood Mac to become the top selling album of 1976, and it was also the 14th best seller of 1977.  The album won Frampton a Juno Award in 1977.

A tribute to the album's staying power, readers of Rolling Stone ranked Frampton Comes Alive No. 3 in a 2012 poll of all-time favourite live albums. The article's text stated, "He was loved by teenage girls, and their older brothers. He owned the year 1976 like nobody else in rock." The success of Frampton Comes Alive! put him on the cover of Rolling Stone, in a famous shirtless photo by Francesco Scavullo. Frampton later said he regrets the photo because it changed his image as a credible artist into a teen idol.

In late 1976, he and manager Dee Anthony visited the White House at the invitation of Steven Ford, the president's son.

On 24 August 1979, Frampton received a star on the Hollywood Walk of Fame at 6819 Hollywood Boulevard for his contributions to the recording industry.

Setbacks
Frampton's following album, I'm in You (1977), contained the hit title single and went platinum, but fell well short of expectations compared to Frampton Comes Alive!.

He starred, with the Bee Gees, in producer Robert Stigwood's poorly received film Sgt. Pepper's Lonely Hearts Club Band (1978). Frampton's career seemed to be falling as quickly as it had risen. He also played guitar on the title song of the 1978 film Grease, a song newly written for the film by Barry Gibb.

Frampton suffered a near-fatal car accident in the Bahamas in 1978 that marked the end of his prolific period and the beginning of a long fallow period where he was less successful than previously. He returned to the studio in 1979 to record the album Where I Should Be. Among those contributing to the album were past band members Stanley Sheldon (bass), Bob Mayo (keyboards/guitar/vocals), and John Siomos (drums/vocals).

In 1980, his album Rise Up was released to promote his tour in Brazil, although he suffered another serious setback that year when all his guitars were thought destroyed in a cargo plane crash that killed four people. Among the instruments he lost was the black Les Paul Custom which he had named "Phenix" (pictured on the cover of Frampton Comes Alive) given to him by Mark Mariana and first used on the night of the recording of the Humble Pie live album Performance, and which he had used all through his early solo career. The guitar was recovered and returned to him in December 2011. The album eventually turned into Breaking All the Rules, released the next year in 1981. These albums were the first he recorded almost completely live. In 1982, following the release of The Art of Control, Frampton tried unsuccessfully to split his ties with A&M Records; he, however, re-signed with the label in 2006 and released his Grammy Award–winning Fingerprints.

Return
Although his albums generally met with little commercial success, Frampton continued to record throughout the 1980s. He did, however, achieve a brief, moderate comeback of sorts in 1986 with the release of his Premonition album, and the single "Lying", which became a big hit on the Mainstream Rock charts. Most notably, he also united with old friend David Bowie, and both worked together to make albums. Frampton played on Bowie's 1987 album Never Let Me Down and sang and played on the accompanying Glass Spider Tour. Frampton would, in 2013, credit his participation in this tour for helping revive his career.

Looking for the band experience again after touring with Bowie, Frampton kept referencing Steve Marriott, and at the beginning of 1991 rejoined his old Humble Pie mate for some shows (Marriott's last English gigs) at the Half Moon in Putney, London. The chemistry was still there for a while, as both Frampton and Marriott laid down some tracks in L.A. and prepared to do a "Frampton-Marriott" tour. However, Marriott abruptly returned to England in April and he died in a house fire less than 24 hours after his return. Broken up by Marriott's death, Frampton went off the road for a time, then reformed his old touring band with his old friends Bob Mayo and John Regan.  At least three songs, and possibly a fourth, from the ended Marriott-Frampton partnership were subsequently recorded; two ending up on Frampton's "Shine On" compilation, a third on his subsequent solo album.

In the late 1990s, he starred in an infomercial plugging the internationally successful eMedia Guitar Method, a piece of instructional software represented as an alternative to taking actual guitar lessons. He claimed in the infomercial that the software was the best way to learn guitar.

In 1994, Frampton wrote and released the album Peter Frampton, the final version of which contained material recorded on Tascam cassette recorders. Originally released on the Relativity label, this record was re-released in 2000 by Legacy Records, with four bonus tracks and additional notes by Peter.

In 1995, Frampton released Frampton Comes Alive! II, which contained live versions of many of the songs from his 1980s and 1990s solo albums. Frampton Comes Alive! II was recorded at The Fillmore Theater on 15 June 1995. Although there was a large amount of marketing for the album, it did not sell well. After Frampton Comes Alive! II, he recorded and toured with Bill Wyman's Rhythm Kings and Ringo Starr's All-Starr Band, where he and Jack Bruce performed a cover version of Cream's "Sunshine of Your Love".

In 2003, Frampton released the album Now, and embarked on a tour with Styx to support it. It was on this tour in 2004 he lost good friend and long time bandmate Bob Mayo. He also toured with the Elms, and appeared in 2006 on the Fox Broadcasting variety show Celebrity Duets, paired with Chris Jericho of WWE fame. They were the first pair voted out.

On 12 September 2006, Frampton released an instrumental work titled Fingerprints. His band consisted of drummer Shawn Fichter, guitarist Audley Freed, bassist John Regan (Frampton's lifelong best friend,), and keyboardist-guitarist Rob Arthur, and guest artists such as members of Pearl Jam, Hank Marvin, and his bassist on Frampton Comes Alive!, Stanley Sheldon – the only member of the backing band on that album still alive.

Recent events
On 11 February 2007, Fingerprints was awarded the 2007 Grammy Award for Best Pop Instrumental Album. In February 2007, he also appeared on the Chicago-based PBS television show Soundstage.

Frampton released his 14th studio album, Thank You Mr. Churchill, on 27 April 2010. In summer 2010 he began touring North America with the English band Yes; the two acts had played stadium shows on a bill together in 1976. His 2010 band consisted of Rob Arthur (keyboards, guitar, backing vocals), John Regan (bass), Adam Lester (guitar), and Dan Wojciechowski (drums).

He embarked on a UK Tour in March 2011 in support of his new album, visiting Leamington Spa, Glasgow, Manchester, London and Bristol.

Frampton went on tour in 2011 with The Frampton Comes Alive 35th Anniversary Tour that showcased and followed exactly the songs on the play list for the original tour from 1976, recorded for the famous Frampton Comes Alive! The concerts each night started with the prerecorded thump of a microphone being turned on, familiar to many fans of the album, followed by the recorded voice of Jerry Pompili saying, "If there was ever a musician that was an honorary member of San Francisco society, Mr. Peter Frampton ...", and then the crowd goes wild. He played the album song-for-song at 69 locations between 15 June 2011, and 22 October 2011, throughout the US.

On 11 June 2011, Frampton performed a live set for "Guitar Center Sessions" on DirecTV. The episode included an interview with program host Nic Harcourt.

In 2013, he performed throughout North America as part of the "Frampton's Guitar Circus" tour which featured periodic guest performers including B.B. King, Robert Cray, Don Felder, Rick Derringer, Kenny Wayne Shepherd, Steve Lukather, Sonny Landreth, Davy Knowles, David Hidalgo, Mike McCready, Roger McGuinn and Vinnie Moore.

On 9 February 2014, Frampton was one of several musicians to participate in The Night That Changed America: A Grammy Salute to The Beatles a tribute to the Beatles on the 50th anniversary of their first appearance on American television.

On 23 June 2014, Frampton released a new album entitled Hummingbird in a Box.

On 11 June 2015, Frampton announced his new studio album: Acoustic Classics; then, on 14 January 2016, he launched the first song: a version of "Do You Feel Like I Do".

In 2016, Frampton was inducted into the Musicians Hall of Fame and Museum.

In 2017 and 2018, Frampton toured with the Steve Miller Band, opening the show.

On 22 February 2019, Frampton announced he will be retiring from touring with his 'Peter Frampton Finale—The Farewell Tour' commencing on 18 June 2019 in Tulsa, Oklahoma, running through 12 October ending in Concord, California at the Concord Pavilion. The tour features special guest Jason Bonham's Led Zeppelin Evening, as well as Peter's son Julian Frampton on the West Coast, stops. He also revealed the reason for the farewell tour; he has received a diagnosis that he has inclusion body myositis (IBM), a progressive muscle disorder characterized by muscle inflammation, weakness, and atrophy (wasting). A dollar of every ticket sold for the tour is donated to benefit Frampton's newly established myositis research fund at Johns Hopkins, where he is being treated.

In June 2019, his most recent album, All Blues, debuted at number one in the Billboard Top Blues Albums Chart.

In December 2019, Frampton announced his farewell UK tour to consist of five performances in May 2020. In April this UK/EU tour was cancelled "because of the COVID-19 virus". In November 2022 Frampton resumed his Finale, the Farewell Tour with three dates in the UK (Stoke, Glasgow, London) and five more in Europe, then one concert at Joe Satriani's workshop in Las Vegas,  announcing in advance that he would be seated on stage during these performances. "Standing", he told Guitar World in September, "would be dangerous for me now, because I get so carried away when I'm playing that I'm liable to fall over". Of how the disease is affecting his ability to actually play the guitar, Frampton continued, "It's starting to affect my hands, but not enough yet, so I can still play a good lick. But I'll be honest, I'm anxious about it."

On 6 August 2022, Frampton came out of retirement for one night to perform during "Buddy Holly's 85th Birthday Celebration" at the Buddy Holly Hall of Performing Arts and Sciences in Lubbock, Texas. "I sat down for the first time ever on stage," he told Guitar World later. "And it felt very comfortable [laughs]. Better than leaning on a piano."

Media appearances
In 1974, Frampton appeared in the movie The Son of Dracula as a guitarist in the Count Downes.

In 1978, he portrayed coastwatcher Peter Buckley in an episode of the World War II drama series Baa Baa Black Sheep titled "A Little Bit of England".

In 1978, he played Billy Shears in the movie Sgt. Pepper's Lonely Hearts Club Band starring along with the three brothers Gibb of the band the Bee Gees. The movie was inspired by the Beatles album of the same name. Critics were hostile, and the film was a box-office failure.

In 1978, he appeared on the parody talk show, America 2-Night.

In 1988, he appeared in the video release of David Bowie's Glass Spider, a video recording of the 1987 tour of the same name.

In 1996, he appeared in an episode of The Simpsons entitled "Homerpalooza", in which he played "Do You Feel Like We Do". He also made a TV appearance in the Family Guy episode "Death Lives", in which Peter Griffin asks Death to bring Peter Frampton to play "Baby, I Love Your Way" to Lois. 

Also in 2000, he served as a technical advisor for Cameron Crowe's autobiographical film, Almost Famous. He wrote some of the songs performed by the fictional band "Stillwater" in the film, supplied guitar tracks, and was the guitar instructor for Billy Crudup, who starred as Russell Hammond, the guitarist for the band. Crudup is quoted as saying, "Who could ask for a better tutor than Peter Frampton?" As an inside joke, he also appears briefly in the film as "Reg", a road manager for Humble Pie, Frampton's real-life former band.

In 2001, he appeared as himself in Drew Carey's Back-to-School Rock 'n' Roll Comedy Hour, in which he performs "You Had To Be There" and appears in a brief scene with Mimi, in which he recalls their past relationship.

On 20 December 2006, he appeared on The Colbert Report. Stephen Colbert had a fake feud with the Decemberists to be decided by a head cutting duel. When Colbert faked an injury, Colbert called on Father Christmas to supply a guitar hero, at which point Frampton appeared and won the shred-down.

On 23 April 2010, he became the all-time celebrity champion of the trivia game called No Apparent Reason, with five correctly answered questions on the nationally syndicated Mark and Brian Radio Program originating from KLOS Los Angeles. However, on 5 May 2010, Frampton was reduced to second place after only two weeks by Luke Perry's answering six questions correctly.

On 4 November 2010, he appeared on The Oprah Winfrey Show as one of her favourite musicians. 

On 21 October 2011, he was honoured at Music City's at Walk of Fame Park in Nashville, Tennessee.

On 2 March 2016, he was interviewed and performed on the Howard Stern Show.

On 6 January 2019, he appeared as himself on Madam Secretary, where he performed a small portion of "Baby I Love Your Way".  He similarly appeared on the final episode of that program (aired 7 December 2019) performing numerous songs at the wedding of the President's daughter.

On 6 August 2021, he challenged OJ Borg through his Radio 2 game "Mid-Afternoon Mastermind" (as OJ was covering for Steve Wright's afternoon show). The subject was Peter Frampton, and OJ scored 2/3.

Personal life

Marriages, other relationships and family
Frampton has been married three times and has three children.

His first marriage was to Mary Lovett, from 1972 to 1976.

He was sued by Penelope J. "Penny" McCall in 1978 for palimony. McCall asked for half of Frampton's earnings during the five years that they were together. According to McCall, she left her husband and gave up her job as a rock promoter and devoted herself full-time to Frampton, just as he achieved superstar status. A New York judge ruled that Frampton and McCall never intended to marry each other and "never held themselves out to the public as husband and wife" and dismissed her complaint because to act otherwise would condone adultery. The case set precedent in New York.

From 1983 to 1993, Frampton was married to Barbara Gold, with whom he had two children named Jade and Julian. The latter co-wrote and sang on Frampton's song "Road to the Sun" from Thank You Mr. Churchill.

His third marriage was on 13 January 1996 to Tina Elfers, with whom he had a daughter, actress Mia Frampton, and a stepdaughter named Tiffany Wiest. Frampton filed for divorce from Elfers in Los Angeles, California, on 22 June 2011, citing irreconcilable differences.

Other
In June 1978, Frampton was involved in a near-fatal car accident in the Bahamas and suffered broken bones, a concussion, and muscle damage. Dealing with the pain of the accident led to a brief period of drug abuse.

Frampton has lived in London and various U.S. locations, including Westchester County, New York; Los Angeles; and Nashville, Tennessee. He moved to Indian Hill, Ohio, a suburb of Cincinnati, in June 2000. This is the birthplace of his ex-wife Elfers, and the city in which they were married in 1996. They chose to live there to be closer to Elfers' family. In 2014, Frampton moved back to Nashville.

Frampton cites the September 11 attacks as his reason for obtaining American citizenship, saying he wanted to begin voting in U.S. elections.

He is a vegetarian.

On 20 October 2020, Frampton published his memoir Do You Feel Like I Do?, co-written with Alan Light.

In December 2022, it was announced BMG had acquired the rights to Frampton's catalogue.

Equipment
On the cover of the double live album Frampton Comes Alive, Frampton plays a highly customized 1954 black Gibson Les Paul Custom that was given to him during a concert by his friend, Marc Mariana. However, he lost it in a cargo plane crash in Venezuela. Frampton and the Les Paul were reunited 30 years later. He continues to play the Les Paul now known as the "Phenix".

Frampton was known as the artist who made the talk box famous. Frampton's talk box was used to transfer the guitar's sound through a plastic tube attached to a microphone. The effect is Frampton's melodic guitar simulating speech while asking the audience on the live track "Do You Feel Like We Do?" Frampton also now sells his own line of custom-designed "Frampton" products, including the talk box.

In 1987, Frampton played two natural-finish maple bodies Pensa-Suhr Strat types, hand-made by New York-based John Suhr. He used a Coral electric sitar, given to him in the late 70s and previously owned by Jimi Hendrix, on David Bowie's 1987 album Never Let Me Down.

Discography

Wind of Change (1972)
Frampton's Camel (1973)
Somethin's Happening (1974)
Frampton (1975)
Frampton Comes Alive! (1976)
I'm in You (1977)
Where I Should Be (1979)
Rise Up (1980)
Breaking All the Rules (1981)
The Art of Control (1982)
Premonition (1986)
When All the Pieces Fit (1989)
Peter Frampton (1994)
Frampton Comes Alive! II (1995)
Now (2003)
Fingerprints (2006)
Thank You Mr. Churchill (2010)
Hummingbird in a Box (2014)
Acoustic Classics (2016)
All Blues (2019)
Frampton Forgets the Words (Instrumental cover tracks) (2021)

References

External links

 
 Audio interview at BBC Wiltshire
 Five audio interview segments with Peter Frampton from 1986
Peter Frampton Live Photo Gallery
The Herd at Harvey Lisberg

 
1950 births
Living people
20th-century British guitarists
20th-century English singers
21st-century British guitarists
21st-century English singers
A&M Records artists
English autobiographers
English child singers
English expatriates in the United States
English male guitarists
English male singer-songwriters
English male singers
English rock guitarists
English rock singers
English tenors
Grammy Award winners
Humble Pie (band) members
Juno Award for International Album of the Year winners
Lead guitarists
Musicians from Kent
Naturalized citizens of the United States
People from Beckenham
People from Indian Hill, Ohio
Ringo Starr & His All-Starr Band members
Singers from London
Singers from Nashville, Tennessee
The Herd (British band) members